Fire Technology is a peer-reviewed journal publishing scientific research dealing with the full range of actual, possible, and potential fire hazards facing humans and the environment. It publishes original contributions, both theoretical and empirical, that contribute to the solution of problems in fire safety and related fields. It is published by Springer in conjunction with the National Fire Protection Association and the Society of Fire Protection Engineers.

Topics include material testing, fire modelling, detection and suppression, performance-based building design, building code, emergency evacuation and human behaviour, fire investigation, wildfire and fire risk analysis.

Annually, three awards are presented to the best papers appearing in Fire Technology. The Harry C. Bigglestone Award for excellence in communication of fire protection concepts is given by the Fire Protection Research Foundation to the best overall paper. The Jack Bono Award for engineering communications is given by The Society of Fire Protection Engineers’ Educational and Scientific Foundation to the paper that has most contributed to the advancement of professional fire protection engineering. And the Tibor Z. Harmathy Award for the best paper led by a student given by Springer.
 
The Jack Watts Award for Outstanding Reviewer of Fire Technology is presented annually to those whose reviews were most valuable in terms of the quality, in-depth, number and timeliness.

Harry C. Bigglestone Award
The Harry C. Bigglestone Award is given annually to the paper appearing in Fire Technology that best represents excellence in the communication of fire protection concepts. Accompanying this award is a USD 2,000 cash prize from the Fire Protection Research Foundation.

It is named to honour the memory of Harry C. Bigglestone, who served as a trustee of the Fire Protection Research Foundation and chair of the NFPA Committee on Central Station Signaling Systems and who was a fellow and past president of the Society of Fire Protection Engineers.

Recipients
Source: National Fire Protection Association

2019 - Wojciech Wegrzyński, Tomasz Lipecki, Jason Lafferty
2018 - Ruben Van Coile, Georgios Balomenos, Mahesh Pandey, Robby Caspeele
2017 - Enrico Ronchi, Erica Kuligowski, Daniel Nilsson, Richard Peacock, Paul Reneke
2016 - Henrik Bjelland, Ove Njå, Atle William Heskestad and Geir Sverre Braut
2015 - Ethan I. D. Foote, Samuel L. Manzello
2014 - Ann Jeffers, Qianru Guo, Kaihang Shi, Zili Jia, Erica Kuligowski
2013 - Kristopher Overholt, Ofodike (D.K.) Ezekoye
2012 - Gregory T. Linteris
2011 - Robert Jansson and Lars Borstrom
2010 - Paul Mason, Charles Fleischmann, Chris Rogers, Alan McKinnon, Keith Unsworth, Michael Spearpoint  
2009 - Tingguang Ma, Michael S. Klassen, Stephen M. Olenick, Richard J. Roby, Jose L. Torero 
2008 - Bogdan Dlugogorski, Eric Kennedy, Ted Schaefer 
2007 - Michael S. Klassen, Jason A. Sutula, Maclain M. Holton, Richard J. Roby, Thomas Izbicki
2006 - Brian Y. Lattimer, Uri Vandsburger, Richard J. Roby
2005 - Tingguang Ma, Stephen M. Olenick, Michael S. Klassen, Richard J. Roby, Jose L. Torero
2004 - Susan L. Rose-Pehrsson, Sean J. Hart, Thomas T. Street, Frederick W. Williams, Mark H. Hammond, Daniel T. Gottuk, Mark T. Wright, Jennifer T. Wong
2003 - Scott K. Anderson, Robert G. Bill, Jr., Richard Ferron, Hsiang-Cheng Kung
2002 - Steven D. Wolin
2001 - James R. Lawson, William E. Mell
2000 - James A. Milke
1999 - Brian Y. Lattimer, Richard J. Roby, Uri Vandsburger
1998 - James Quintiere
1997 - Mohammed Sultan, Noah L. Ryder, Frederick Leprince, James A. Milke, Frederick W. Mowrer, Jose L. Torero
1996 - Thomas McAvoy, James A. Milke
1995 - Charles J. Kibert, Douglas Dierdorf
1994 - Robert G. Bill, Jr., Hsiang-Cheng Kung
1993 - David J. O’Connor, Gordon W. H. Silcock
1992 - John R. Hall, Jr., Ai Sekizawa
1991 - Frederick W. Mowrer
1990 - Homer W. Carhart, Francis R. Faith, J. Thomas Hughes, Curtis T. Ewing
1989 - Dingyi Huan, John Krasny, John Rockett
1988 - Frederick W. Mowrer, Robert Brady Williamson
1987 - Richard L. Smith
1986 - Peter F. Johnson
1985 - T. T. Lie, Kenneth J. Schwartz

See also

 List of engineering awards
 List of occupational health and safety awards

Notes

External links 

English-language journals
Fire protection
Fire prevention
Building engineering
Wildfire suppression
Engineering journals
Publications established in 1965
Quarterly journals
1965 establishments in the United States